Pecilocin is an anti-fungal.

References

Antifungals